Tormé is a 1958 studio album by Mel Tormé, arranged by Marty Paich, his first album for Verve Records.

Track listing
 "That Old Feeling" (Lew Brown, Sammy Fain) – 3:31
 "Gloomy Sunday" (Sam M. Lewis, Rezso Seress) – 5:16
 "Body and Soul" (Frank Eyton, Johnny Green, Edward Heyman, Robert Sour) – 3:39
 "Nobody's Heart" (Lorenz Hart, Richard Rodgers) – 1:54
 "I Should Care" (Sammy Cahn, Axel Stordahl, Paul Weston) – 2:57
 "The House Is Haunted (By the Echo of Your Last Goodbye)" (Basil Adlam, Billy Rose) – 2:53
 "Blues in the Night" (Harold Arlen, Johnny Mercer) – 8:08
 "I Don't Want to Cry Anymore" (Victor Schertzinger) – 3:07
 "Where Can I Go Without You?" (Peggy Lee, Victor Young) – 3:28
 "How Did She Look?" (Gladys Shelley, Abner Silver) – 3:25
 "'Round Midnight" (Bernie Hanighen, Thelonious Monk, Cootie Williams) – 3:16
 "I'm Gonna Laugh You Right out of My Life" (Cy Coleman, Joseph McCarthy) – 2:33

Personnel

Performance
 Mel Tormé - vocals
 Marty Paich - arranger, conductor

References

1958 albums
Mel Tormé albums
Albums arranged by Marty Paich
Albums produced by Norman Granz
Verve Records albums
Albums conducted by Marty Paich